The German place name Marienwerder refers to:

Marienwerder, the German name of the city Kwidzyn, in northern Poland
Mareinwerder, the German name of the village Załęże, in northwestern Poland
Marienwerder (region), a former government region of Prussia
Marienwerder (district), a former district of Prussia
Marienwerder, Brandenburg, a community in the administrative district of Barnim, Germany
Part of the urban district Herrenhausen-Stöcken in the city of Hanover, Germany